Candle Creek is a western tributary of the Kiwalik River, located on the Seward Peninsula of the U.S. state of Alaska. The creek's name is attributed to the resemblance of the trees on the banks of the creek to candles when they are covered with snow. With the discovery of gold in 1901, Candle Creek's reputation as a top gold-yielding site was fixed.

Geography
Candle Creek is situated at the head of the main divide between the north and south drainages of the Seward Peninsula. The stream occupies a broad, shallow valley with only mildly sloping sides, making its movement more difficult. In addition to gold, other minerals found include arsenopyrite, pyrite, galena, chalcopyrite, magnetite, ilmenite, rutile, zircon, garnet, and cerussite. Bean and Blank creeks are eastern tributaries, while Jump, Patterson, Potato, Ptarmigan, Thomas, and Willow creeks are western tributaries.

Geology
In 1901, placer gold was discovered on Candle Creek both in the river bed and the valley. The geological setting of the valley is attributed to late Precambrian, early Paleozoic eras. Quartz, mica and schists are the formations recorded, marked by quartz stringers and granitic dikes. Placer gold finds are covered by iron oxide in the form of dark organic matter. Gold was also discovered in gravel in ironstone concretions. Other minerals found in placer gold are arsenopyrite, large amount of pyrite, galena, chalcopyrite, ilmenite, rutile, garnet, cerussite and sometimes also magnetite.

Mining history
Soon after the discovery of gold at Nome, prospectors explored the more readily accessible streams of Seward Peninsula. Candle Creek was staked in July 1901, by Enos Thomas, Alexander Patterson, Robert W. Snyder, and James Blankenship. Although Blankenship was probably the first miner to drive stakes on Candle Creek, the other three men were the first to enter the region. These four men staked claims on the most promising portions of the main stream, each staking one claim on the lower ends of the tributaries, thus acquiring rights to a considerable amount of ground. Other miners arrived within a few months. During the summer of 1902, mining occurred between Potato Creek and Kiwalik River, resulting in a large amount of the easily extractable gold being recovered. In the following year, prospecting decreased. About twelve small plants were at work in 1916–17 on Candle Creek and its tributaries. Placer mining, including dredging, boomed till the 1950s. According to reported figures, the gold mined in the creek was more than 0.6 million ounces. Candle Creek's name is derived from a natural phenomenon noted by the mining prospectors during the spring months, when the snow-covered twigs on the creek bank resemble candles.

References

Rivers of the Seward Peninsula
Rivers of Northwest Arctic Borough, Alaska
Rivers of Alaska